Admiral Sir George Ommanney Willes  (19 June 1823 – 18 February 1901) was a Royal Navy officer who went on to be Commander-in-Chief, Portsmouth.

Early life
Born at Hythe, Hampshire in 1823, Willes was the son of Captain George Willes, RN, by his wife Anne Lacon, daughter of Sir Edmund Lacon, Baronet.
He was educated at the Royal Naval College, Portsmouth, and joined the Royal Navy in 1838.

Naval career
In April that year he was promoted Commander, and in May 1856 Captain. He was given command of the frigate HMS Chesapeake in 1859, and of HMS Impérieuse in 1861. In both cases as Flag Captain to the Commander-in-Chief, East Indies. In this capacity he took part in the Battle of the Taku Forts during the Second Opium War.

In 1864 he was made Captain of the ironclad warship HMS Prince Consort.

He became Admiral-Superintendent at Devonport in 1876 and Commander-in-chief, China Station in 1881. His last post was as Commander-in-Chief, Portsmouth in 1886. He retired in 1888.

Family
In 1855 he married Georgiana Matilda Josephine, daughter of William Joseph Lockwood and granddaughter of Sir Mark Wood, 1st Baronet. His younger brother was the cricketer Edmund Willes.

See also

References

|-

1823 births
1901 deaths
Royal Navy admirals
Knights Grand Cross of the Order of the Bath
Royal Navy personnel of the Crimean War
People from New Forest District
Royal Navy personnel of the Second Opium War